Deverbal nouns are nouns that are derived from verbs or verb phrases. The formation of deverbal nouns is a type of nominalization (noun formation). Examples of deverbal nouns in English include organization (derived from the verb organize), the noun construct  (from the verb construct ), discovery (from the verb discover), and opening (in the sense of 'aperture') from the verb open.

Distinction between deverbal nouns, verbal nouns, and gerunds in English 
In English, the deverbal noun stands in contrast with the verbal noun and the gerund. 

A verbal noun has the same verb+ing form as a participle or gerund. Syntactically, unlike a gerund, a verbal noun functions purely as a noun; it cannot take adverbs or objects. Semantically, like a gerund, a verbal noun directly names the action described by the verb, as in Brown's deft painting of his daughter is wonderful, which describes the way that Brown paints, the building of the bridge took 20 years, which relates to the process of building, or the opening of the crypt, which relates to the act or process of opening the crypt.

A deverbal noun in English is formed either by conversion (turn), by suffixation (decision), or other modifications (speech). Unlike verbal nouns, the meanings of deverbal nouns cannot be predicted mechanically from the verb; one must, so to speak, look in the dictionary (they are lexicalized). 

While the -ing suffix is one manner of creating deverbal nouns, such deverbal nouns differ from verbal nouns. Deverbal nouns with -ing often describe the results of actions (building in the building is tall, painting in the painting was stolen, or opening in the opening was wide) or events, such as meeting in the meeting was effective.

A verbal noun is an abstract uncountable noun while a deverbal noun can be either countable or uncountable. 

Verbal nouns and deverbal nouns are distinct syntactic word classes. Functionally, deverbal nouns operate as autonomous common nouns, while verbal nouns retain verbal characteristics. (A similar distinction can be made between verbal adjectives – such as participles used verbally – and deverbal adjectives.)

The distinction between verbal nouns and gerunds is illustrated in the following English sentences, in which words derived from verbs by adding -ing behave sometimes as gerunds, and sometimes as verbal nouns.  (Further information can be found in the article on -ing.)
 Catching fish is fun.
 Here catching is a gerund; it takes an object (fish), like the verb catch.
 Shouting loudly is enjoyable.
 Here shouting is a gerund; it is modified by the adverb loudly, like the verb shout.
 Loud shouting makes me angry.
 Here shouting is a verbal noun; it is modified by an adjective loud (like a noun such as music).

Sometimes (particularly when the -ing word is used alone without modifiers) the matter is ambiguous, although there may be a difference in meaning depending on whether it is intended as a verbal noun or gerund. Consider the sentence:
 Shouting is nice.
Here shouting could be either a gerund or a verbal noun. If it is intended as a gerund, it can be assumed to mean that shouting is nice for the person doing the shouting (To shout is nice and Shouting loudly is nice.) On the other hand, if intended as a verbal noun, it can be assumed to mean that shouting is nice for those experiencing the shouting. (Compare sentences in which the subject is unambiguously a verbal noun, such as Loud shouting is nice.)

Semantic types 
Deverbal nouns may be categorized semantically according to what facet of the process (that the verb refers to) they denote, that is, what facet of the process is reified (construed as a thing). Examples are:
Nouns denoting an activity, such as running, relaxation
Nouns denoting a specific action, such as murder, discovery (in many cases a noun may refer to either a single action or a general activity, depending on context)
Agent nouns, such as invader, singer
Patient nouns, denoting the party to whom or for whom something is done, such as draftee, employee
Nouns denoting manner, such as walk in She has a funny walk
Nouns denoting an ability, such as speech in She regained her speech
Nouns denoting a result, such as dent, scratch
Nouns denoting an object or system of objects, such as building, fencing, piping.

When words are derived by conversion, it may not be clear whether a noun is derived from a verb or vice versa. This is common in English; examples of words that are both verbs and nouns (with related meanings) are bruise, hope, rain, work, etc. See also initial-stress-derived noun.

By language

French 
There are two connotations of the deverbal nouns: the one formed without any suffix (e.g.: abat from abattre), or any noun descending from a verb.

Hindi 
Some verbs can be made into nouns by adding certain suffixes. E.g. रोना (to cry) + दू = रोंदू (someone who cries).

Indonesian 
Nouns in Indonesian can be nominalized from a verb using suffix "-an", prefix "peng-", or circumfixes "ke- -an" (ke- prefix), "peng- -an", and "per- -an" (per- prefix), for example (e.g.: the verb bangun could be affixed into "bangun-an", "pem-bangun", "ke-bangun-an", "pem-bangun-an").

Japanese 

In Japanese, verbal nouns are treated (grammatically and orthographically) as verb forms, while deverbal nouns are treated as nouns. This is reflected in okurigana (following characters), which are used for verb conjugation and, similarly, for verbal nouns, but not for deverbal nouns. For example,  (hana-su, hana-shi, hanashi) are the verb, nominalized verb (VN), and deverbal noun (DVN) of "converse", "conversation (the act)", "conversation (the episode)" – the first two are written with following hiragana characters, as verb forms, while the latter is written without following characters, as a noun.

Mandarin Chinese 
Chinese is a morphologically deficient language. Many of the nouns denoting an action can be used as a verb without morphological change. For example,  yanjiu ‘research’ can be used as a noun and a verb depending on syntactic context.

See also
 Denominal verb

Reference 
4. A Comprehensive Grammar of the English Language. Longman Publication. Page. 1288 (Chapter 17) 

Nouns by type